Pure Guava is the third studio album and major label debut by American rock band Ween, released on November 10, 1992 by Elektra Records.

Background
The album features one of Ween's most well-known songs, "Push th' Little Daisies". The song was also released as a single on August Records in 1993, including both the album and radio edit versions of the song (the latter replacing the word "shit" with a sample of Prince squealing from "Alphabet St."), as well as the tracks "Ode to Rene", "I Smoke Some Grass (Really Really High)" and "Mango Woman"; "Puerto Rican Power" replaces "I Smoke Some Grass" on some editions.

Many of the songs on this album come from at least two tapes that the band made for friends, including ones titled Springtape and The Caprice Classic Tape, as stated by Dean Ween on JJJ radio in 1993.

The song "Big Jilm" was inspired by a car dealer named James A. Lemons, who worked at the dealership owned by Dean Ween's father.

The song "Poop Ship Destroyer" would become a live staple for the band, although the live performances traditionally bear little resemblance to the album version and are instead played as a protracted improvised jam, either to punish or reward an audience.

Reception

AllMusic editor Heather Phares called the album "more polished and concise" than their previous albums The Pod and GodWeenSatan: The Oneness and stated that "Considering Elektra released it, it's just as uncompromising as their previous work, but it hints at just how much further they could go with their music." Bill Wyman in Entertainment Weekly gave it a B+, noting that it was, "Very, very weird, but I can't stop playing Ween’s Pure Guava." Robert Christgau was more negative in his Village Voice consumer guide, finding that the band wrote their "fucked-up" songs "without thinking (and how)". He went on to disparagingly call them "the kind of rec-room gigglefritzes who enjoy a good nigger joke when they're sure their audience is sophisticated enough to enjoy it. And to be perfectly honest, I don't hear one of those here."

Legacy
In 1999, Ned Raggett, writing for the website Freaky Trigger, named Pure Guava the 53rd best album of the '90s, hailing it as "the greatest 'major label debut after an indie career' record of the decade. Not least because it was recorded in the same exact conditions and from the same exact sessions as most of said earlier indie career, so that means that Ween hit the big time with a record compiled from the outtakes that weren't good enough for their previous album, and it's still one of the best records ever made." The same year, German magazine Spex included the album on their list of the 100 best albums of the 20th century. Aphex Twin named it one of his 10 favorite albums of all time (making it one of two Ween albums on the list, the other being The Pod).

Track listing
All tracks written by Ween, except "Flies on My Dick," by Ween and Guy Heller.

Personnel
Ween
Dean Ween
Gene Ween

Additional musicians
Mean Ween (Chris Williams) – second vocal on "Little Birdy"
Guy Heller – vocals on "Flies on My Dick"
Larry Curtin – backing vocals and whistling solo on "I Saw Gener Cryin' in His Sleep"
Scott Lowe – second vocal and whistling solo on "Don't Get 2 Close (2 My Fantasy)"

Technical
Dean Ween – producer, engineer
Gene Ween – producer, engineer
Andrew Weiss – mixing
Patricia Frey – digital editing
Howie Weinberg – mastering
Tom Nichols – photography
Reiner Design Consultants – design
Stephan Said – additional instrumentation

Charts

References

1992 albums
Ween albums
Elektra Records albums
Neo-psychedelia albums